The Island Soccer League is a professional six-a-side association football (also known as 'soccer') league based in Bermuda. The league is the brainchild of Bermuda legend David Bascome.

Founded in 2006, the league started play in 2007.

Style of play
Essentially a football league, the league plays with a modified code, adopting rules from indoor soccer and the traditional sport. All matches are played at the Bermuda National Stadium with a reduced pitch size.

Players for each team are selected through an American-style draft system.

Teams
The premier league is known as the Cellular One Adult league.

All teams play at the National Stadium in Hamilton.

ISL Championships

External links
 BDA Sun article on the launch
 official web site

Football leagues in Bermuda
2006 establishments in Bermuda
Sports leagues established in 2006